Untitled is a painting by Clementine Hunter. It is in the collection of the National Museum of Women in the Arts  (NMWA) in Washington, D.C. in the United States. It is a rare self-portrait by an artist who usually depicted everyday life on the plantations that she lived on in Louisiana.

Description
Untitled is a self-portrait by Hunter. Keeping with many of her paintings, the painting is a landscape work, with a cloudy sky on the top and a tree and flowers growing from the bottom. An African American woman stands in the middle with a blue dress and her hands outstretched with a bouquet of roses. She faces a cut out, from an exhibition brochure from 1974, that features a photograph of the artist. Hunter's signature is on the lower proper left.

History
Hunter created this work in 1981. It was gifted to the National Museum of Women in the Arts by Evelyn M. Shambaugh.

Interpretation
Untitled is a rare self-portrait by Hunter. Curators at the NMWA interpret the painted woman in the artwork as showing respect to the artist for the success she has gained.

References

1981 paintings
Paintings by Clementine Hunter